The Masters Five or Masters V was a Southern Gospel Music quartet founded in 1980 by Hovie Lister as a special consolidation of well-known performers from The Statesmen Quartet and The Blackwood Brothers. The group featured J.D. Sumner as bass, Rosie Rozell and then Steve Warren as tenor, James Blackwood and Jake Hess alternating between lead and baritone, and Lister on piano. Their self-titled debut album, The Masters V, won the 1981 Grammy Award for best traditional gospel performance. The quartet subsequently endured several personnel changes, often due to health and age-related issues. The group's final performance was in 1988.

Discography
The Masters V (1981) Skylite SLP 6256; reissued as How Great Thou Art (1988) Temple Records
O What a Savior (1982 ) Skylite SLP 6265 (Rozell, Blackwood, Hess, Sumner, Lister)
The Masters V Present Their Majestic Bass, J.D. Sumner (1982) Skylite
The Legendary Masters V (1982) Skylite SLP 6282 (Rozell, Blackwood, Hess, Sumner, Lister)
Featuring… (1983) Skylite (Nielsen, Blackwood, Hess, Sumner, Lister)
Live at the Joyful Noise (1983) Skylite (Nielsen, Blackwood, Hess, Sumner, Lister)
Thru the Years (1984) Skylite (Warren, Blackwood, Hess, Sumner, Lister)
Good Things (1984) Skylite (Warren, Blackwood, Hess, Sumner, Lister)
The Master’s Hymns (1985) Skylite (Warren, Blackwood, Hess, Sumner, Lister)
The Masters V Present Their Magnificent Bass, J.D. Sumner (1985) Skylite (Warren, Blackwood, Hess, Sumner, Lister)
Sing Fabulous Blackwood Brothers Hits (1985) Skylite (Warren, Blackwood, Hess, Sumner, Lister)
The Masters V Present 50 Years with the Fabulous James Blackwood (1985) Skylite Records
Classics of Yesteryear (1986) Skylite SLP 6363 (Warren, Blackwood, Hess, Sumner, Lister)
Have a Little Faith (1986) Merinet
Sing Me a Song About Jesus (1987) Riversong (Warren, Blackwood, Hess, Sumner, Lister)
The Legend Lives On (1988) Skylite (Nielsen, Toney, Hill, Sumner, Lister)
Sing Award Winning Songs of JD Sumner (1988) Skylite (Nielsen, Toney, Hill, Sumner, Lister)
Superlative Bass JD Sumner (1988) (Nielsen, Toney, Hill, Sumner, Lister)
The Original Masters Five (1991) Bibletone Records

Members

Line-ups

Hovie Lister 1980-1988
J.D. Sumner 1980-1988
James Blackwood 1980-1987
Jake Hess 1980-1987
Rosie Rozell 1980-1983
Shaun Nielsen 1983/1988
Steve Warren 1984-1987
Chris Hess
Tommy Thompson
Buddy Burton
Charles Yates
Ed Hill 1987-1988
Jack Toney 1988

References

American gospel musical groups
Musical groups established in 1980
Southern gospel performers
Gospel quartets